Bryony Kimmings (born 30 March 1981) is a British live artist based in London and Cambridgeshire. She is an associate artist of the Soho Theatre, and, in 2016, was commissioned to write The Pacifist's Guide to the War on Cancer for Complicite Associates.

She creates multi-platform art works to provoke change. Her work centres mostly around "social experiments", which in the past have included the artist retracing an STI to its source, spending seven days in a controlled environment in a constant state of intoxication and becoming a pop star invented by a nine-year-old.

She has performed at the Soho Theatre, London, Kimmings' work has toured across the world including: The Southbank Centre, London, BAC Grandhall, Antifest (Finland), Culturgest (Portugal), Fusebox Festival (Texas), Melbourne International Comedy Festival (Australia), and Lisinski Operahouse (Croatia).

Early career
Kimmings graduated with a degree in Modern Drama from Brunel University in 2003. In a 2011 interview she said of her time at Brunel: "It was Live Art and the history of performance artists that excited me the most", and so immediately afterwards she established the company 'Glass Eyed' with friends. 'Glass Eyed' created work for two years before being dissolved.

In 2006 she began Celebrityville a soap cabaret following the lives of forgotten celebrities living in a fictional town. A new episode was created every month between 2006 and 2008. Describing working on Celebrityville Kimmings said "this gave me a baptism of fire really, making such a large volume of work, learning about how to run a night, what to do if things broke half way through, making costumes, doing marketing - everything." When Celebrityville ended, Kimmings began to explore a solo live art career with autobiographical themes.

Shows

Performance work 
 I'm a Phoenix, Bitch (2018). Premiered at the Battersea Arts Centre. This piece can be viewed as a subversive feminist musical piece, with elements of a pop-video, horror film, art installation and therapy session. This piece comes from a deeply personal place for Kimmings, taking inspiration from a moment in 2015 when she separated from her fiancé and then her child became seriously ill which caused Bryony to then lose her own mind. In 2016, Kimmings nearly drowning, followed by post-natal breakdowns, an imploding relationship and an extremely sick child that left her feeling overwhelmed with life. Four years later, she is able to deal with her life again, but she is wearing the scars of that year like having a weight on her shoulders. It provokes the questions of: Who do we become after trauma? How do we turn pain into power? How do we fly instead of drown? Toured:
Fake it ‘til you Make it (2015). Premiered at the Traverse Theatre, Edinburgh. This piece centres around the story of Bryony's then fiancé, Tim Grayburn, and his battle with his chronic depression. The performance is also highlighting the taboo of mental health and what is not spoken about within society. It is performed through song, dance, slapstick, voice-over, masks, while it also gives the audience an insight into depression, mainly through the male perspective and why they are more likely to hide it from friends, family and colleagues as this is a common occurrence in society where men are more likely to avoid discussing their feelings Toured:
 That Catherine Bennett Show (2014). Premiered at the Southbank Centre, London. This performance was created by Kimmings and her nine-year-old niece, looking at creating the pop star culture to create their own dinosaur-loving, bike-riding, tuna pasta-eating, alternative pop star called Catherine Bennett. This is a show about family activism, children's rights and believing in your own power as an individual to change the world, even as a child. This performance was specifically for children aged 6–9 years old. The use of the Horrible Histories Suffragettes song allows the performance to be educational but also recognisable to the audience, as most children have watched Horrible Histories either at home or in school. This performance can be looked as inspiration for children to change the world. Toured: Soho Theatre Imagine Children’s Festival, The Southbank Centre, Bristol Old Vic, The Egg, Bath Stratford Discover Children's Story Centre Quarterhouse, Folkestone Camp Bestival, The Why Festival, The Southbank Centre, Manchester Contact.
 Credible Likeable Superstar Role Model (2013). Premiered at the Pleasance Dome, Edinburgh. This show explores Kimmings personal relationship with sex and alcohol. Alongside her on stage is her nine-year old niece to push Kimmings to create her alter-ego Catherine Bennett,  an alternative pop star who is an expert on dinosaurs, and who also loves tuna, pasta and animals. The piece was created to highlight the hyper-sexualisation of tweenage girls, where their role models are the likes of Katy Perry and Rihanna. This piece isn't described as a theatre but more as a call to arms against those who profit from selling thongs to children. The piece can be described as being cool, funny, heart-warming and infectiously optimistic.
Heartache.Heartbreak. (2012). Premiered at Culturgest, Lisbon. This performance is about an investigative journalist who is conducting door to door enquiries about how to get over a broken heart, the responses she gets are a mixture of the trite, nihilistic and the devastatingly sad and each of them being replayed with hilarious performative embodiment or mockery. What emerges from this performance is how universal all the voices are, making the performance fluid, expansive and physical. This performance is a stack of individual coping mechanisms harvested and smashed together into one big malfunctioning machinery of misery, making the piece relatable to the audience. Toured: Culturgest in Lisbon, Forest Fringe and The Bush Theatre.
Kablooey! (2012). Premiered at Battersea Arts Centre, London. This performance is a ten-minute piece that was made for people at a time, both adults and children. The idea is to help Barbra Bliss, whose flat has been singed and is the former life and soul of the party, escape the Kablooey, which is an exploding spell that has been put on her home by a power-hungry housing officer. The aim of the performance is for the audience to solve the riddle, whilst also aiming to make Barbra laugh again, in hopes of stopping the room exploding again. 
Mummy Time (2011). Premiered at The Junction, Cambridge. This is a ten-minute piece that has been described as a high octane, funny and ultimately moving 1-to-1 experience for festivals. An audience member becomes the fourth member of the family, who has just got home from school. The mum is knee deep in sheets, nan is in the hospital and the uncle is on the phone for a score. This performance follows the audience member eating 'poverty tea', doing their homework and helping wrap and weigh drugs for mum, until child services interrupt. 
A Date with the Night (2011). Premiered at ANTI-Contemporary Art Festival, Kuopio. This performance was a one-off, 1-to-1 piece that compressed a messy and hideous drunk blind date to one length of a mega-mix song. It starts with an innocent dinner, through to bars, clubs, alleys and then ultimately straight into bed. Kimmings and her single audience member created the date together, improvising small talk, lots of shots and disco dancing, so that when morning dawned, the regret and shame set in. 
7 Day Drunk (2011). This performance has a two part song and dance routine which is about Kimmings and her rocky relationship with alcohol while investigating the historical links between artists and mind enhancing drugs. The show was created from material made during a seven-day experiment, in which Kimmings was kept in various states of scientific drunkenness although she performs sober.  Toured: Motel Mozaique in Holland, Harpenden Public Halls, Phoenix in Exeter, Showroom in Chichester, Contact in Manchester, Warwick Arts Centre Soho Theatre, Lincoln Performing Arts Centre, The Lantern Theatre in Sheffield, The Arches in Glasgow, Colchester Arts Centre, Wales Millennium Centre Mayfest, Bristol Old Vic, Pulse Festival in Ipswich, Jacksons Lane, Latitude Festival, Assembly Venues in Edinburgh, The Junction in Cambridge, ICIA in Bath, Plymouth Barbican, Basement in Brighton, Project Arts Centre in Dublin.
 Sex Idiot (2010) Awards: Best Emerging Artist, Total Theatre Award 2010, The West Australian Arts Editor Award 2015, Best Comedy, Adelaide Fringe Weekly Award 2015, Best Comedy Award, The Advertiser Adelaide 2015.  This performance stemmed from Byrony Kimmings discovering that she had caught an STI. It presents her sexual journey as she tries to retrace her footsteps in order to discover who she had contracted it from. It is a comedy performed through dance and song, with a cabaret theme and is relatable to those who have had a one-night stand.  Toured: Fringe World in Perth,  Adelaide Fringe Festival, Melbourne International Comedy Festival, Southbank Centre, City of Women Festival in Slovenia, Salvage Vanguard in Texas, Soho Theatre, Lisinski Hall in Croatia, Nuffield Theatre, Colchester Arts Centre, Barbican, The Junction in Cambridge, Contact in Manchester, ICIA in Bath, Phoenix in Exeter, Latitude Festival, Bite Size Festival @ Warwick Arts Centre,  Zoo Roxy in Edinburgh, The Basement, Brighton.
 The Hall of Gratuitous Praise (2011) A form of live art with a feel-good audio installation designed for public spaces or 1-to-1 experiences. A 1960s LA hippy-style, spa-like experience where people are able to sit down and relax while Bryony Kimmings tells them how great they are. Toured Forest Fringe, Shambala Festival, Norfolk and Norwich Festival, The Junction in Cambridge
Mega (2011)  This performance is based around Kimmings childhood, being 9 years old in 1990 and growing up. It is based around her memory of a new overpriced restaurant that was built on the side of the A14 near Peterborough, Kimmings' home town. Kimmings performs as her 9-year-old self in shell suits and a walkman. Toured: Forest Fringe at Edinburgh Festival, The Junction, Pulse Festival, Take Off Festival at The Royal and Derngate, The Southbank Centre, The Point in Eastleigh
The Fanny Song (2010). A song about the different names that vaginas have been labelled which was created and performed by Bryony Kimmings in 2010 and then made a reappearance in 2012 through its popularity. In February 2012, Bryony Kimmings and her team then created a music video for the song. Accessible on YouTube.
Double Dare (2010) An interactive performance with audience participation which involves Bryony Kimmings and Jess Latowicki encouraging dares and challenges which require bravery. Toured:  Shunt, Sampled Festival, The Roundhouse, Chelsea Theatre, Basement, Brighton as part of White Nights
A Pacifist's Guide to the War on Cancer (2016). This is a musical performed as a whistle-stop tour through five unconventional stories about cancer. Bryony Kimmings presents the other side of the poster campaigns and pink ribbons with the reality of cancer while using metaphors that surround cancer, shiny costumes, big anthems and a range of mixed emotions Toured: Liverpool Playhouse, Newcastle northern stage.  'Making of' documentary is accessible on YouTube.

As playwright 
A Pacifist's Guide to the War on Cancer (2016). Book by Bryony Kimmings and Brian Lobel. Lyrics by Kimmings. Co-Produced by Approach Complicite Associates and National Theatre. 
The Boys Project (2017).  A performance created by Kimmings which engaged young men from council estates all over the UK, including Leeds, Cardiff, Peterborough, Birmingham, Manchester and London. It was a long term art and activism project which exploded media stereotypes and the political marginalisation of the young.

As screenwriter 
Last Christmas (2019). Co-screenwriter with Emma Thompson. A romantic comedy film directed by Paul Feig, inspired by the Wham! song "Last Christmas".

Approach 
Known primarily for creating autobiographical work, Kimmings achieved notoriety with her 2010 piece Sex Idiot. In it, she revealed her sexual and her romantic history after discovering she had contracted an STI and told of the quest to find out which of her former partners had given it on to her. She toured this show until 2015. In her 2011 piece 7 Day Drunk Kimmings collaborated with a team of scientists to analyse the impact of alcohol on her creativity.

In an interview in March 2011, speaking of the drivers behind her work Kimmings said: "I guess in a way it is an artist's duty to say and explore the things that are untouchable, or hard to talk about."

In a 2012 interview for Pulse Fringe Festival, Kimmings introduces herself as "an artist who makes autobiographical work" she continues to say her work "always follows a kind of autobiographical experiment that I go on." Her profile on the British Council of Drama and Dance website says: "Bryony works autobiographically and begins the development of her work with a social experiment. She is inspired by the taboos and anomalies of British culture and her work promotes the airing of her own dirty laundry to oil conversations on seemingly difficult subjects."

Personal life 
Kimmings was born in Huntingdon and grew up in St Ives, Cambridgeshire, attending St Ivo School. She has an older sister, whose then 9-year-old daughter inspired her to develop her 2013 show Credible Likeable Superstar Role Model.

In November 2015, Kimmings gave birth to her son Frank. The boy's father was her fiancé at the time, Tim Grayburn. Frank was diagnosed with West Syndrome, a form of epilepsy, soon after he was born. In her 2018 show I'm a Phoenix, Bitch, Kimmings processed how she experienced post-natal depression, had a severely ill infant and went through a break-up all in one year.

Awards

Sex Idiot
 Total Theatre Award 2010 
 Listed in Time Out magazine's Best of the Year (2010) – off-West End and Fringe Theatre category 
 West Australian Arts Editor Award 2015 
 The Advertiser Best Comedy Award, Adelaide Fringe Festival 2015

Fake it ‘til you Make it
 Best Theatre Award, Fringe World Perth 2015
 Best Theatre Award, Adelaide Fringe Festival 2015
 Herald Angel Award, Edinburgh Fringe Festivatl 2015
 Short-listed for the Amnesty Freedom of Expression Award, Edinburgh Fringe Festival 2015

References

External links 
 Bryony Kimmings' website
 Bryony Kimmings' blog
 7 Day Drunk blog
 
 

1981 births
Living people
English performance artists
Place of birth missing (living people)
21st-century English artists
English women artists
21st-century British women artists
Alumni of Brunel University London
Artists from London